The 2012–13 Liga Gimel season saw 95 clubs competing in 6 regional divisions for promotion to Liga Bet.

Hapoel Bu'eine (Upper Galilee), Hapoel Bnei Nujeidat (Jezreel), Hapoel Yoqneam (Samaria), Shimshon Bnei Tayibe (Sharon), Hapoel Ramat Israel (Tel Aviv) and Maccabi Sderot (Central-South) all won their respective divisions and were promoted to Liga Bet.

During the summer, as several vacancies were created in Liga Bet, runners-up Maccabi Sulam (Jezreel), F.C. Tzeirei Tayibe (Sharon) and Hapoel Abirei Bat Yam (Tel Aviv) were also promoted to Liga Bet.

Upper Galilee Division

Jezreel Division

Samaria Division

During the season, Beitar Umm al-Fahm (after 15 matches) folded and its results were annulled.

Sharon Division

F.C. Tzeirei Tayibe competed with Hapoel Abirei Bat Yam from the Tel Aviv division for a vacant spot in Liga Bet, and lost the match 0–1. After the match another spot became available in Liga Bet, and F.C. Tzeirei Tayibe was promoted as well.

Tel Aviv Division

Central-South Division

References
Liga Gimel Upper Galilee The Israel Football Association 
Liga Gimel Jezreel The Israel Football Association 
Liga Gimel Samaria The Israel Football Association 
Liga Gimel Sharon The Israel Football Association 
Liga Gimel Tel Aviv The Israel Football Association 
Liga Gimel Central The Israel Football Association 

Liga Gimel seasons
5
Israel